Plantin may refer to:

Printing and publishing
Christophe Plantin (1520–1589), humanist, printer, and publisher
Plantin (typeface)
Plantin Press, 16th century Antwerp publisher
Plantin-Moretus Museum, Antwerp
Plantin Polyglot, a 16th century multilingual Bible

Other meanings
Plantin premetro station, Antwerp
6808 Plantin, asteroid
Arabella Plantin, 18th-century British novelist

See also
 Plantain (disambiguation), similar spelling